The Territorial Prelature of Caravelí is a Roman Catholic territorial prelature (pre-diocesan jurisdiction) in the Ecclesiastical province of the Metropolitan of Ayacucho in southern Peru.

Its cathedral episcopal see is  located in the city of Caravelí.

History 
The Territorial Prelature of Caravelí was established on 14 December 1996, on territories split off from the Metropolitan Archdiocese of Ayacucho and its own Metropolitan, the Archdiocese of Arequipa.

Statistics 
As per 2014, it pastorally served 119,754 Catholics (82.9% of 144,370 total) on 30,000 km² in 22 parishes and 5 missions with 13 priests (9 diocesan, 4 religious), 60 lay religious (6 brothers, 54 sisters) and 6 seminarians.

Episcopal ordinaries
(all Roman rite, so far Europeans and/or members of a Latin missionary congregation)

Territorial Bishop-Prelates of Caravelí
 Federico Kaiser Depel, Sacred Heart Missionaries (M.S.C.) (°Germany) (21 November 1957 – retired 25 May 1971), Titular Bishop of Berrhœa (29 October 1963 – death 26 September 1993)
 Bernhard Franz Kühnel Langer, M.S.C. (°Poland) (26 January 1983 – retired 18 June 2005)
 Juan Carlos Vera Plasencia, M.S.C. (first native incumbent) (18 June 2005 – 16 July 2014), next stayed on as Apostolic Administrator of Caravelí (16 July 2014 – 27 May 2017) a while when appointed Military Ordinary  of the Peru (16 July 2014 – ...) by Pope Francis
 Reinhold Nann (°Germany) (27 May 2017 – ...), no previous prelature.

See also 
 List of Catholic dioceses in Peru

Sources and external links 
 GCatholic.org, with Google satellite photo - data for all sections
 Catholic Hierarchy
 

Roman Catholic dioceses in Peru
Roman Catholic Ecclesiastical Province of Ayacucho
Territorial prelatures
Christian organizations established in 1996
Roman Catholic dioceses and prelatures established in the 20th century